Amasia (also Romanized as Amasiya) is a village in the Armavir Province of Armenia.

See also 
Armavir Province

References 

Populated places in Armavir Province
Populated places established in 1930
Cities and towns built in the Soviet Union
1930 establishments in Armenia
Yazidi populated places in Armenia